Francisco Novella Azabal Pérez y Sicardo (1769 – 1822) was a Spanish general in New Spain and interim viceroy of the colony from July 5, 1821 to July 21, 1821, during the Mexican war of independence.

Biography  
A previous viceroy, Félix María Calleja del Rey, 1st Count of Calderón, had established a fort in the old tobacco warehouse in Mexico City, named La Ciudadela. Viceroy Juan Ruiz de Apodaca, Novella's predecessor, converted it into a storehouse for arms and munitions, but these were slowly being pilfered. He ordered Brigadier Francisco Novella to take charge of La Ciudadela and stop the thievery. Novella considered that task beneath his dignity, and was able to enlist the support of the Audiencia of Mexico. The incident made Novella an enemy of Ruiz de Apodaca.

After the Plan de Iguala united the insurgents and many of the royalist troops in New Spain, the remaining royalists, led by Brigadier Buceli, declared Viceroy Ruiz de Apodaca inept and deposed him (July 5, 1821). He was sent to Spain to face charges, but there he was absolved and returned to duty. General Francisco Novella was made interim viceroy until the arrival of Ruiz de Apodaca's replacement, Juan O'Donojú, a short time later.

Novella served for just over two weeks. His appointment was irregular, and had not originated in Spain. His name appears in some lists of viceroys of New Spain, but not in all.

References
 García Puron, Manuel, México y sus gobernantes, v. 1. Mexico City: Joaquín Porrua, 1984.
 Orozco L., Fernando, Fechas Históricas de México. Mexico City: Panorama Editorial, 1988, .

1769 births
1821 deaths
Viceroys of New Spain
Spanish colonial governors and administrators
Spanish generals
Military personnel from Madrid